Horsmonden is a closed railway station on the closed Hawkhurst Branch in Kent, England.

Background
The station was equipped with a single 300 ft platform on the up side, together with a loop serving a fruit packing warehouse. To the rear of the station are the stationmaster's house, a three-storey building with dormer windows, and a goods yard. The village of Horsmonden lies a short distance to the west of the station.

The station was closed with the line on 12 June 1961. The station is now used as a garage called "Old Station Garage" and the stationmaster's house is a private residence.

Footnotes

References

External links
 Horsmonden railway station at Disused-Stations.org.uk
 Website of "Old Station Garage" with photos of the station
 Horsmonden station on navigable 1940 O. S. map
 Signal diagram, 1923

Disused railway stations in Kent
Railway stations in Great Britain opened in 1892
Railway stations in Great Britain closed in 1961
Former South Eastern Railway (UK) stations